Beagh GAA is a Gaelic Athletic Association club located near Shanaglish in south County Galway, Republic of Ireland.  The club is almost exclusively concerned with hurling. The club competes in Galway GAA competitions and fields two teams, Senior and Junior B. In 2008 it amalgamated with neighbouring Kilbacenty at juvenile level forming Michael Cusack's Hurling Club.

History
Beagh is one of few clubs whose foundation predates the Gaelic Athletic Association; their first recorded game, against Kilbeacanty in 1870, was attended by Michael Cusack himself.

The 1980s were the most successful years in the club's history with the club achieving Senior Hurling status in 1980 by winning the County Intermediate title.

In 2013, Beagh reached their first ever Galway Senior Hurling Championship semi-final when they defeated Turloughmore in the quarter-final by 2-12 to 1-13. They were defeated in the semi-final by Loughrea by 2-18 to 1-11.		

On 15 October 2016, Beagh won the County Junior C Hurling Championship, beating Turloughmore in the final by 1-15 to 0-15.

On 2 September 2017, Beagh won their first All-Ireland Sevens title at Kilmacud Crokes GAA club, defeating Clare's Whitegate 5-17 to 1-22.

Honours

Hurling
 Galway Intermediate Hurling Championship (2)
 1980, 2002
 Galway Junior C Hurling Championship (1)
 2016
 All-Ireland Sevens Hurling (1)
 2017

Notable players
 Finbarr Gantley - All-Ireland Senior Hurling Championship winner 1980
 Mick Deely - Member of the Galway Senior hurling panel 1982-1983
 John Moylan -  Member of the Galway Senior hurling panel 1984-1985
 Adrian Tuohy - All-Ireland Senior Hurling Championship winner 2017

References

External links
Official Site
Galway GAA site
GAA Info Profile
2008 Website
Club History (Archived)

Gaelic games clubs in County Galway
Hurling clubs in County Galway